Abendland is a 2011 documentary film by Nikolaus Geyrhalter. The documentary, which has only scenes at night, explores European obsession with technology and security. It was released in Austria and Germany in 2011 and in the United States in 2012.

Critical reception
Manohla Dargis of The New York Times called Abendland a "visually precise and politically amorphous" portrait of an imagined community: "The overall impression is a vision of Europe as a mosaic, as an artful amalgam of perfectly framed, seemingly disconnected moments during a long shared night, give or take a time zone change or two." Nick Pinkerton, reviewing for The Village Voice, describes the documentary, "The film's principal subjects are the eurozone's service and security industries, showing a continent busy saving its citizens from themselves." Pinkerton compared Abendland to the works of other Austrian directors Ulrich Seidl and Michael Glawogger in how they show "under-the-hood images of the global economy’s workings".

Notes

References

External links
 

2011 films
2010s German-language films
2011 documentary films
Austrian documentary films
Films directed by Nikolaus Geyrhalter
Films shot in the Czech Republic
Films shot in London
Films shot in Germany
Films shot in Belgium
Films shot in the Netherlands
Films shot in Vienna
Films shot in Switzerland
Films shot in Spain
Films shot in Rome
Documentary films about technology